James Anthony Merlino (born 19 August 1972) is an Australian retired politician who served as the member for Monbulk in the Victorian Legislative Assembly, as a member of the Labor Party. He served as Deputy Premier of Victoria and Minister for Education from December 2014 until June 2022 in the First and Second Andrews Ministry.

Political career

Merlino was elected at the 2002 state election defeating Steve McArthur. Merlino comfortably retained his seat at the state election in 2006 and became the Minister for Sport and Recreation and Youth Affairs, securing a place in cabinet. Under new Premier John Brumby's government he retained that ministry and gained a new role as Minister Assisting the Premier on Multicultural Affairs. He subsequently became Police Minister following the resignation of the previous Minister.

When the ALP lost government in the 2010 state election, Merlino became Shadow Minister for Police, the TAC and Road Safety. In February 2012, he was elected unopposed as Deputy Leader of the Labor Party in Victoria, following the resignation of Rob Hulls, becoming deputy leader of the opposition

With the election of the Andrews Labor Government in late 2014, Merlino became Deputy Premier and Education Minister. On 10 June 2016, Merlino also became Minister for Emergency Services following the resignation of Brunswick MP Jane Garrett from the Andrews Ministry.

In March 2021, Merlino became the Acting Premier of Victoria, after Daniel Andrews fell down a flight of stairs while holidaying on the Mornington Peninsula, suffering several broken ribs and a broken vertebra from the fall. Merlino was Acting Premier until Andrews returned to work on June 28.

In June 2022, Merlino announced his retirement from politics and did not contest the November state election. He stepped down from his ministerial roles on 27 June.

Merlino was a member of Labor's right faction. He is a Catholic.

Football

In December of 2022 he was part of the successful Andrew Gowers ticket in the  board election.

References

External links
James Merlino at re-member

1972 births
Living people
Australian Labor Party members of the Parliament of Victoria
Australian Roman Catholics
Labor Right politicians
Members of the Victorian Legislative Assembly
Deputy Premiers of Victoria
Australian politicians of Italian descent
21st-century Australian politicians
Hawthorn Football Club administrators